Sherbrooke is a provincial electoral district in the Estrie region of Quebec, Canada. It comprises the Jacques-Cartier and Mont-Bellevue boroughs of the city of Sherbrooke.

It was created for the 1867 election (and an electoral district of that name existed earlier in the Legislative Assembly of the Province of Canada and the Legislative Assembly of Lower Canada).

In the change from the 2001 to the 2011 electoral map, its territory was unchanged.

Members of the Legislative Assembly / National Assembly

Election results

* Result compared to Action démocratique

* Result compared to UFP

|-

|-

|}

|-

|Independent
|Normand Gilbert
|align="right"|169
|align="right"|0.53
|align="right"|–
|-

|-

|Natural Law
|Christian Simard
|align="right"|53	
|align="right"|0.17
|align="right"|-0.88

|}

|-
 
|Liberal
|Gilles Lapointe
|align="right"|13,342	
|align="right"|42.84
|align="right"|-8.55

|-

|Natural Law
|Serge Trépanier
|align="right"|326
|align="right"|1.05
|align="right"|–

|}

References

External links
Information
 Elections Quebec

Election results
 Election results (National Assembly)
 Election results (QuébecPolitique)

Maps
 2011 map (PDF)
 2001 map (Flash)
2001–2011 changes (Flash)
1992–2001 changes (Flash)
 Electoral map of Estrie region
 Quebec electoral map, 2011 

Sherbrooke
Politics of Sherbrooke